Metasia hymenalis is a species of moth in the family Crambidae. It is found in France and Spain, as well as North Africa (including Morocco) and Iran.

The wingspan is about 23 mm.

References

Moths described in 1854
Metasia
Moths of Europe